This is a list of crossings of the River Wharfe, a river in Yorkshire, England, in the downstream direction from the Oughtershaw Beck to the confluence with the River Ouse.

List of crossings

References

Crossings
Wharfe
Lists of bridges in the United Kingdom
Wharfe
Lists of buildings and structures in West Yorkshire
Lists of buildings and structures in North Yorkshire